Corina Șuteu was the Culture Minister of Romania. She served from May 2016 to January 2017, following her position as State Secretary within the Ministry of Culture in the cabinet of Dacian Cioloș. from February to April 2016.

In 1983, she graduated from the University of Bucharest's literature faculty, specializing in Romanian and English, which she taught for the next four years at a Făgăraș high school. From 1987 to 1989, she edited Teatrul magazine. From 1991 to 1993, she directed the Theatre Union of Romania. From 1993 to 1995, she directed Bucharest's Theatrum Mundi. From 1995 to 2001, she headed the cultural management master's program at Business School of Dijon. From 2002 to 2005, at the University of Nantes' Institut de l'Homme et de la Technologie, she coordinated the cultural management department. From 2006 to 2012, she directed the New York City office of the Romanian Cultural Institute. From 2012 to 2016, she was a freelance consultant.

She is the initiator and president of the Romanian Film Festival in New York since 2006 (on hiatus in 2016).

From 2006 to 2012 she has been the Director of the Romanian Cultural Institute in New York, the Romanian public agency dedicated to cultural diplomacy and international arts exchange, initiating and implementing the new vision on cultural diplomacy promoted by RCI. Under her leadership, RCI New York forged a highly visible and flourishing open space for intercultural dialogue, connecting vibrant Romanian arts and artists to the evolving international scene. She also held the presidency of the network of European Cultural Institutes in NYC (EUNIC) in 2010.

She became interested in managing cultural organizations immediately after the fall of communism. At the beginning of the 1990s she was the director of the Theatre Union of Romania (UNITER) and of Theatrum Mundi in Bucharest. Passionate about the emerging and controversial disciplines of cultural management and cultural policies, she continued working in France, where she was for nine years the director of the European master's degree in Cultural management of the Business School in Dijon. In 1995 she also initiated the first regional training program in cultural management for Eastern European professionals, the ECUMEST program.

She has also worked extensively as independent trainer, consultant and researcher in the fields of cultural cooperation and cultural management and policies with leading organizations throughout Europe, while her key interests continued to keep a balanced focus on the relation between policies and practices in the arts.

She is author of Another brick in the wall. A critical review of cultural management education in Europe (Boekman Foundation, Amsterdam, 2006) and of numerous articles and studies.

References 

Year of birth missing (living people)
Living people
University of Bucharest alumni
Romanian Ministers of Culture
Romanian theatre critics
Women theatre critics
Romanian theatre managers and producers
Romanian magazine editors
Romanian women editors
Women members of the Romanian Cabinet
Women magazine editors
21st-century Romanian women politicians
21st-century Romanian politicians